X Factor is a Kazakh music talent show for aspiring pop stars across the nation and is based on the international franchise. The first season in Kazakhstan started in January 2011. Auditions were held in 12 Kazakh cities and started on 2 October 2010.
The Judges were the three music producers Nagima Eskalieva, who was the already the chairwoman of the panel of SuperStar KZ, Sultana Karazhigitova and Alexander Shevchenko.

On 22 May 2011, the back then-22-year-old Daria Gabdull (Дария Габдулл), labeled by the judges as the "Kazakh Beyoncé", won the show ahead of the trio Spasibo. Gabdull won a two-years-contract with Sony Music.

Selection process

Applications and auditions

Bootcamp

Judges' houses and wildcards
After the auditions, twenty-four candidates were chosen, eight in each of three categories. They were:
16-24s: Daria Akparova, Ruslan Berdimatov, Eliza Dzhakereeva, Alexander Filatov, Daria Gabdull, Louise Karimbaeva, Abdulkarim Karimov, Ruslan Krivenkov
25 and over: Maral Dzhusupova, Asel Karsybaeva, Eldar Myrzakhanov, Yuri Mukhortov, Gulzhiyan Ospanova, Julia Pereima, Dmitry Tsoi, Margarita Tumanyan
Vocal groups: Musaev sisters, Vladimir Kim & Marina Beysehanova, Ansari, Dee Kree, Spasibo, Sweet, National, Faith Kahn & Serik Salmakeev

The twelve eliminated acts were:
16-24s: Eliza Dzhakereeva, Alexander Filatov, Louise Karimbaeva, Ruslan Krivenkov
25 and over: Maral Dzhusupova, Eldar Myrzakhanov, Julia Pereima, Dmitry Tsoi
Vocal groups: Musaev sisters, Vladimir Kim & Marina Beysehanova, Ansari, Sweet

Although they were eliminated in the judges' house stage, Musaev Sisters, Eldar Myrzahanov and Ruslan Krivenkov were brought back as wildcards.

Contestants
After the wildcards were revealed in the first live show, the final fifteen acts were confirmed as follows:

Key:
 – Winner
 – Runner-up
 – Third Place

Live shows

Format

Results summary
Colour key

Live show details

Week 1 (12/13 March)
Theme: American Songs

Judges' votes to eliminate
Nagima Eskalieva: Ruslan Berdimatov, backed her own act
Sultana Karazhigitova: Ruslan Berdimatov
Alexander Shevchenko: Yuri Mukhortov, backed his own act

Week 2 (19/20 March)
Theme: TBA

Judges' votes to eliminate
Nagima Eskalieva: National, backed her own act
Sultana Karazhigitova: Gulzhiyan Ospanova, backed her own act
Alexander Shevchenko: Gulzhiyan Ospanova

Week 3 (26/27 March)
Theme: Kazakh Songs

Judges' votes to eliminate
Nagima Eskalieva: refused to vote
Sultana Karazhigitova: Margarita Tumanyan
Alexander Shevchenko: Margarita Tumanyan

Week 4 (4/5 April)
Theme: Movie Songs

Judges' votes to eliminate
Nagima Eskalieva: Eldar Myrzahanov
Sultana Karazhigitova: Eldar Myrzahanov
Alexander Shevchenko: refused to vote

References

External links
 Official website

Kazakhstan 01
2011 Kazakhstani television seasons